Floyd E. Romesberg is an American biotechnologist, biochemist, and geneticist formerly at Scripps Research in San Diego, California. He is known for leading the team that created the first Unnatural Base Pair (UBP), thus expanding the genetic alphabet of four letters to six in 2012, the first semi-synthetic organism in 2014, and the first functional semi-synthetic organism that can reproduce its genetic material in successive offspring, in 2017.  He left Scripps after a Title IX investigation.

Awards and nominations
 2015: Nobel Laureate Signature Award
 2018: Royal Society of Chemistry (RSC) Bioorganic Chemistry Award

References

External links
 Romesberg Labs at Scripps Institute
 Synthorx 
 

Living people
American geneticists
Biotechnologists
Scripps Research faculty
American biochemists
Year of birth missing (living people)